The 2000 NCAA Division I men's soccer tournament was the 41st organized men's college soccer tournament by the National Collegiate Athletic Association, to determine the top college soccer team in the United States. The Connecticut Huskies won their second national title by defeating the Creighton Bluejays in the championship game, 2–0. The final match was played on December 10, 2000 in Charlotte, North Carolina at Ericsson Stadium for the second straight year. All other games were played at the home field of the higher seeded team.

Seeded Teams

Bracket

Final

References

Tournament
NCAA Division I Men's Soccer Tournament seasons
NCAA Division I men's soccer tournament
NCAA Division I men's soccer tournament